The 1978 McEwans Golden Masters was an invitational snooker tournament which took place in June 1978 in Newtownards, Northern Ireland. The tournament featured four professional players - Ray Reardon, Dennis Taylor, Doug Mountjoy and Graham Miles.

Mountjoy won the title beating Reardon 4–2 in the final.

Main draw

References

1978 in snooker
Snooker competitions in Northern Ireland
Snooker